Vadim Davletshin (born 7 October 1984) is a former Russian tennis player.

Davletshin has a career high ATP singles ranking of 383 achieved on 26 July 2004. He also has a career high ATP doubles ranking of 326 achieved on 9 August 2004.

Davletshin made his ATP main draw debut at the 2003 St. Petersburg Open.

References

External links

1984 births
Living people
Russian male tennis players